Cadla Ua Dubthaig, second Archbishop of Tuam, 1161–1201.

Ua Dubthaig was  member of a Connacht ecclesiastical family originally from Lissonuffy in what is now north-east County Roscommon. The family produced a number of abbots and bishops.

The History of the Popes describes him as:

a person of great talent; and was employed in much important business, of Church and State, both in England and at Rome.

The Irish annals merely record that Cadla Ua Dubthaig, i.e. archbishop of Connachta, rested in Cunga Feíchín. According to Giraldus Cambrensis he participated at the Synod of Cashel in 1172. The Annals of Tigernach say that he brought the final text of the Treaty of Windsor back to the Irish king Rory O'Conor in 1175. He was rewarded with the title Earl of Lissonuffy.

See also

 Domhnall Ua Dubhthaigh
 Muireadhach Ua Dubhthaigh

References

 http://www.ucc.ie/celt/published/T100005B/
 http://www.ucc.ie/celt/published/T100005C/
 https://archive.org/stream/fastiecclesiaehi04cottuoft#page/n17/mode/2up

Archbishops of Tuam
13th-century Roman Catholic archbishops in Ireland
People from County Galway
People from County Roscommon
12th-century Roman Catholic archbishops in Ireland
1201 deaths
Year of birth unknown